Nature's Microworlds is a 2012 British nature documentary series. Produced by the BBC, the series is narrated by Steve Backshall and produced by Doug Mackay-Hope. There are thirteen thirty-minute episodes in the series, which was first broadcast on BBC Four. Each episode focuses on its eponymous region, exploring the wildlife of the microclimate found there: The featured ecosystems include the archipelago of volcanic islands known as the Galapagos, the grasslands of the Serengeti in Africa, the Amazon rainforest covering most of South America, the kelp forest located in California's Monterey Bay, the Okavango Delta where the Okavango River empties into a wetland surrounded by the Kalahari Desert, and the Arctic wilderness of the Svalbard archipelago.

Episodes 
There are thirteen thirty-minute episodes in the series—plus a three-part specials series—first broadcast on BBC Four on the dates shown.

Season 1 (2012)

Season 2 (2013)

Insect Specials (2013)

Critical reception
David Crawford of the Radio Times criticized the first episode for its short length and "lightly sketched" coverage of science, but wrote that it is "full of arresting images". A similar criticism was made by Jonathan Wright in The Guardian, who stated that the first episode is "far too short at 30 minutes and thus skims over some subjects". Crawford writes that the fifth episode, like the first, "packs a lot of information into its short running time," and praised the final episode on Svalbard, likening it to a " mini-episode of Frozen Planet" filled with "jaw-dropping, eye-covering scenes". The Guardian Martin Skegg was more positive on the length of the final episode, writing that "relaying the complex interplay of life in just 30 minutes, the film is a punchy antidote to the sometimes bloated 'event' nature".

References

External links

 Hidden Habitats at BBC America
 Nature's Microworlds at Australian Broadcasting Corporation

2012 British television series debuts
2013 British television series endings
BBC television documentaries
Nature educational television series
English-language television shows
Documentary films about nature